Peter Baldacchino (born December 5, 1960) is a Maltese-born American prelate of the Roman Catholic Church. Since July 23, 2019, he has been serving as the bishop of the  Diocese of Las Cruces in New Mexico. He previously served as an auxiliary bishop for the Archdiocese of Miami in Florida from 2014 to 2019.

Early life and education 
Baldacchino was born on December 5, 1960, in Sliema, Malta. He was educated at Mount Carmel College, now Saint Elias College. While he was a student at the University of Malta he became interested in the Neocatechumenal Way, a Catholic formation movement.  He earned a diploma in sciences from the University of Malta, electrical installation licenses from Umberto Calosso Trade School in Malta, and a Bachelor of Arts degree from Thomas Edison State College in Trenton, New Jersey. Baldacchino attended the 1989 World Youth Day in Santiago de Compostela, Spain.

While studying at the Immaculate Conception Seminary School of Theology at Seton Hall University in South Orange, New Jersey, he lived at the Neocatechumenal Way's Redemptoris Mater Missionary House of Formation in Kearny, New Jersey. He received a Master of Divinity degree from Seton Hall.

Career

Priesthood 
Baldacchino was ordained a priest for the Archdiocese of Newark on May 25, 1996, by Archbishop Theodore McCarrick.  Baldacchino holds dual citizenship in the United States and Malta.

After his ordination, Baldacchino served as the parochial vicar at Our Lady of Mt. Carmel Parish in Ridgewood, New Jersey, from  1996 to 1999. He was assigned as the chancellor of the Mission Sui Iuris of Turks and Caicos in 1999.  In 2002 he became the pastor of Our Lady of Providence Parish on Providenciales Island of Turks and Caicos  Pope Benedict XVI named Baldacchino a chaplain of his holiness, with the title of monsignor.  He is fluent in English, Italian, Maltese, Spanish and Creole.

Auxiliary Bishop of Miami 
Pope Francis named Baldacchino as titular bishop of Vatarba and an auxiliary bishop of the Archdiocese of Miami on February 20, 2014. He was consecrated on March 19, 2014, by Archbishop Thomas Wenski. Archbishops Patrick Pinder and Charles Dufour were the principal co-consecrators.

Bishop of Las Cruces
On May 15, 2019, Pope Francis appointed Baldacchino bishop of the Diocese of Las Cruces. He is the first prelate associated with the Neocatechumenal Way to head a diocese in the United States.  He was installed on July 23, 2019.

See also

 Catholic Church hierarchy
 Catholic Church in the United States
 Historical list of the Catholic bishops of the United States
 List of Catholic bishops of the United States
 Lists of patriarchs, archbishops, and bishops

References

External links 
 Roman Catholic Diocese of Las Cruces Official Site 
 Roman Catholic Archdiocese of Miami Official Site

1960 births
Living people
People from Sliema
University of Malta alumni
Thomas Edison State University alumni
Seton Hall University alumni
Maltese expatriates in the United States
21st-century Roman Catholic bishops in the United States
Neocatechumenal Way
Bishops appointed by Pope Francis